Barbara Masterson Staggs (July 18, 1940 – November 22, 2014) was a longtime educator in Muskogee, Oklahoma and a legislator in the Oklahoma House of Representatives. During her time in the legislature, Staggs assisted as a member of the Common Education Committee and was integral in passing many bills, such as one that lead to the creation of the Oklahoma Music Hall of Fame in Muskogee.

Staggs earned a bachelor's degree in Education from Northeastern State University and both a master's degree in English and a doctorate in Education from the University of Tulsa. She worked as a classroom teacher for 15 years, then moved up in school administration until she became Superintendent of Public Schools in Talequah, Oklahoma. Aftr three years in Talequah, she decided to run for the Legislature.

Early life and education
Barbara Staggs was born in her grandmother's home in Hulbert, Oklahoma in 1940 to parents Truman and Veleria
Masterson. She was an only child and three weeks after her birth, was moved to and raised in Muskogee. Staggs graduated from Muskogee High School in 1958. She lived her entire life in Muskogee, other than a brief time she spent in Tahlequah, Oklahoma while she was serving as superintendent of the school district. In 1959, Barbara married Ross Staggs on the 29th of August. She received her undergraduate degree in Education from Northeastern State University in 1963. She received her master's degree in English and her doctorate in Education from the University of Tulsa in 1968 and 1987 respectively.

Career
After her education, Staggs taught in Muskogee for 15 years. During her time as a classroom educator, Staggs taught English, drama, speech, and broadcasting. After her time in the classroom, Staggs served as the assistant principal for six years and served as the principal for three years. She was the first female to hold the position of secondary principal in Muskogee. In 1990, Staggs started as the superintendent for Tahlequah public schools. Again, she was the first woman to hold this position and served until 1993 when she decided to run for office.

Legislative accomplishments
Her first term beginning in 1994, Staggs was the first female elected to the legislature in district 14. Some of her accomplishments in office include aiding in passing a bill that provided funding to the Oklahoma Department of Libraries as well as passing a bill that made it legal for persons with disabilities to hunt with a crossbow. Staggs helped with the creation of the Oklahoma Music Hall of Fame in Muskogee, OK as well as aided in the bill that made throwing objects off of an overpass a felony. She was strongly involved with education legislation and served on the Common Education Committee, and in other capacities. Staggs served for 12 years until her retirement in 2006.

Service and volunteer work
After her retirement in 2007, Staggs was elected  to the Chairmanship of Muskogee County Democrats and worked as a Northeastern State University representative. While in retirement, Staggs served her hometown in many facets, including volunteer work with the following organizations:
Leadership Oklahoma
Muskogee Morning Optimists
Oklahoma Music Hall of Fame and Museum
Five Civilized Tribes Museum
Three Rivers Museum
Muskogee Development Corporation
NSU Alumni board
Board of Directors of Southwest Educational Development Laboratory
NAACP
Port of Muskogee board
Oklahoma Commission on the Status of Women
Oklahoma Foundation for the Education of the Blind
Noon Lions Club
Service League of Muskogee
Lakewood Girl Scouts
Soroptimist
CASA
Women's Leadership Conference
2010 for Freshman Girls

References

External links
Women of the Oklahoma Legislature Oral History Project Oklahoma Oral History Research Program

Women state legislators in Oklahoma
Democratic Party members of the Oklahoma House of Representatives
1940 births
2014 deaths
21st-century American politicians
21st-century American women politicians
People from Muskogee, Oklahoma
Northeastern State University alumni
University of Tulsa alumni